Ammoudia (before 1928: Σπλάντζα - Splantza) is a small fishing village in the municipal unit of Fanari in the Preveza regional unit in Epirus, Greece. The mouth of the river Acheron is in the village.

History
During the Axis occupation Ammoudia was among the villages targeted by a joint German-Cham Albanian armed operation in August 1943.

In the 1960s', the majority still mainly spoke the Albanian language and their knowledge of the Greek language was limited. There is still an Albanian-speaking community in Ammoudia.

Historical population

See also

List of settlements in the Preveza regional unit

References

External links

GoAmmoudia
GTP Travel Pages

Populated places in Preveza (regional unit)
Albanian communities in Greece